KWSC (91.9 FM, "91.9 the Cat") is a radio station broadcasting an alternative music format. Licensed to Wayne, Nebraska, United States, the station is currently owned by Wayne State College.

References

External links
 
 

WSC
WSC